Adriana Yamila Díaz González  (born October 31, 2000) is a Puerto Rican table tennis player.  she was ranked 3 (under age 21) and 11 in the Table Tennis World Ranking according to the International Table Tennis Federation. Díaz is sponsored by Butterfly and Adidas. Adriana is the sister of the table tennis player, Melanie Díaz, and cousin of Brian Afanador.

International competition
On April 1, 2016, Díaz made history becoming the first Puerto Rican female table tennis player to qualify for an Olympic Games. She competed at the 2016 Summer Olympics where she defeated Olufunke Oshonaike 4–2 in the preliminary round before losing to Li Xue 0–4 in the second round.

Professional career
Díaz made her professional debut for Dabang Smashers of the Ultimate Table Tennis league on June 16, 2018, with a 3:0 victory over 
Pooja Sahasrabudhe. On her second outing, she defeated the winner of the 2018 ITTF Europe Top 16 Cup, Bernadette Szocs (2:1).

On January 30, 2022, Díaz, along with her sister Melanie, ranked #5 in Women's Doubles Pairs by the International Table Tennis Federation

Clubs 
 Zhengding Table Tennis (2017–2018)
 Dabang Smashers T.T.C. (2018)

Achievements 
2020 Pan America Cup - Gold Medal
2019 Pan American Games - Gold Medal
2016 US Open - Gold Medal
2015 Pan American Games - Bronze Medal
2014 Central American and Caribbean Games - Gold Medal
2014 Pan American Sport Festival – Women's Singles Champion
2014 Latin American Youth Championships – Cadet Girls Singles Champion, Cadet Girls Doubles Champion, Cadet Mixed Doubles Champion
2013 Peru Junior & Cadet Open – Cadet Girls Singles Champion

Awards

References

External links 
 
 
 
 Adriana Díaz at the 2019 Pan American Games

2000 births
Living people
Puerto Rican table tennis players
People from Utuado, Puerto Rico
Table tennis players at the 2016 Summer Olympics
Olympic table tennis players of Puerto Rico
Pan American Games bronze medalists for Puerto Rico
Pan American Games medalists in table tennis
Table tennis players at the 2015 Pan American Games
Central American and Caribbean Games gold medalists for Puerto Rico
Central American and Caribbean Games silver medalists for Puerto Rico
Central American and Caribbean Games bronze medalists for Puerto Rico
Competitors at the 2014 Central American and Caribbean Games
Competitors at the 2018 Central American and Caribbean Games
Table tennis players at the 2018 Summer Youth Olympics
Table tennis players at the 2019 Pan American Games
Central American and Caribbean Games medalists in table tennis
Medalists at the 2019 Pan American Games
Medalists at the 2015 Pan American Games
Table tennis players at the 2020 Summer Olympics